Maripanthus is a genus of Asian jumping spiders first described by Wayne Maddison, I. Beattie and K. Marathe in 2020.

Species
 it contains six species:
M. draconis Maddison, 2020 (type) – Singapore
M. gloria Caleb, 2021 – India
M. jubatus Maddison, 2020 – India
M. menghaiensis (Cao & Li, 2016) – China
M. reinholdae Maddison, 2020 – Borneo (Malaysia, Brunei)
M. smedleyi (Reimoser, 1929) – Indonesia (Sumatra)

See also
 Bavia
 Nannenus
 List of Salticidae genera

References

Further reading

Salticidae genera
Spiders of Asia